L-class destroyer may refer to:

Laforey-class destroyer (1913), a class of Royal Navy torpedo boat destroyers
L and M-class destroyer, a class of Royal Navy destroyers launched between 1939 and 1942